Hypasteridium is a genus of fungi in the family Meliolaceae. The genus was circumscribed by Carlos Luigi Spegazzini in 1924.

References

Sordariomycetes genera
Meliolaceae